Actinopodidae (Mouse spiders) is a family of mygalomorph orb weaver spiders found in mainland Australia and South America usually in open forest. Species are most common in Queensland, Australia. It includes mouse spiders, whose bites, though rare, are considered medically significant and potentially dangerous.

Description 
Actinopodidae has wider vision then most other Australian mygalomorphs and have a wide front to there carapace. Mouse spiders are stout black with species size varying from 10 mm-35 mm in length. Species have distinctively bulbous heads and jaw regions. Mouse spiders are oftentimes confused with funnel-web spiders. Depending on the species, the abdomen is black or dark blue with a light grey to white patch top. Legs are dark and may appear thin and the head is shiny black. Female of the family are stockier and larger.

Burrow 
Mouse spiders live in soil covered burrows with a hinged top. Burrows can extent to a depth of 30 cm (12 inches). The purpose of the burrow is for refuge from predators, temperature control and parasites. Male spiders will wander away from the burrow in search for female spiders for mating while females stay in the burrow for most of their life.

Diet 
Species of Actinopodidae are ambush hunters that lie in their burrow lid at night preying on insects that are within catching range of actinopodidae.

Genera
, the World Spider Catalog accepts the following genera:

Actinopus Perty, 1833 — South America
Missulena Walckenaer, 1805 — Australia, Chile
Plesiolena Goloboff & Platnick, 1987 — Chile

See also
 List of Actinopodidae species

References

External links

 Find-a-spider guide

 
Mygalomorphae families